Making Friends is the fourth studio album by punk rock band No Use for a Name, released in 1997. It also includes a hidden track cover of the KISS song "Beth". At the end of "Beth" the band starts to play "Soulmate" but gets interrupted by Tony Sly.
"Fields of Athenry" is an Irish folk ballad (written in 1970 by Pete St. John) which has been covered by many other bands such as Dropkick Murphys & The Dubliners.

Track listing
All songs written by No Use For A Name except "Fields Of Athenry".
 "The Answer Is Still No" – 2:33 (Opening dialogue between Alec Baldwin and Ed Harris from the film Glengarry Glen Ross)
 "Invincible" – 2:22
 "Growing Down" – 2:02
 "On the Outside" – 2:51 (Opening dialogue is David Thewlis from the film Naked)
 "A Postcard Would Be Nice" – 2:01
 "Secret" – 3:24
 "Best Regards" – 1:50
 "Revenge" – 1:52
 "Sidewalk" – 2:17
 "3 Month Weekend" – 1:17
 "Sitting Duck" – 1:21
 "Fields of Athenry" – 11:40

Personnel
 Tony Sly – vocals, guitar
 Chris Shiflett – guitar
 Matt Riddle – bass
 Rory Koff – drums
 Dicky Barrett – vocals on Growing Down
 Karina Deniké – vocals on On the Outside

References

1997 albums
No Use for a Name albums
Fat Wreck Chords albums
Albums produced by Ryan Greene